Wilhelm Ekensskär (born 18 June 1998) is a Swedish speed skater.

He took part in the 2022 European Speed Skating Championships - individual distances where he came 16th in the 5000 metres.

References

External links
 

Swedish male speed skaters
1998 births
Living people